Pablo Jaramillo Gallardo (born 9 April 1977) is a Spanish para-cyclist. He won a bronze medal at the 2020 Summer Paralympics in the mixed team sprint C1–5. In addition, he won five medals at the UCI Para-cycling Track World Championships between 2009 and 2017.

References 

1977 births
Living people
Paralympic bronze medalists for Spain
Paralympic cyclists of Spain
Medalists at the 2020 Summer Paralympics
Cyclists at the 2020 Summer Paralympics